In mathematics and abstract algebra, a Bol loop is an algebraic structure generalizing the notion of group.

A loop, L, is said to be a  left Bol loop if it satisfies the identity

, for every a,b,c in L,

while L is said to be a right Bol loop if it satisfies

, for every a,b,c in L.

These identities can be seen as weakened forms of associativity, or a strengthened form of (left or right) alternativity.

A loop is both left Bol and right Bol if and only if it is a Moufang loop. Different authors use the term "Bol loop" to refer to either a left Bol or a right Bol loop.

Properties
The left (right) Bol identity directly implies the left (right)  alternative property, as can be shown by setting b to the identity.

It also implies the  left (right) inverse property, as can be seen by setting b to the left (right) inverse of a, and using loop division to cancel the superfluous factor of a. As a result, Bol loops have two-sided inverses.

Bol loops are also power-associative.

Bruck loops
A Bol loop where the aforementioned two-sided inverse satisfies the automorphic inverse property, (ab)−1 = a−1 b−1 for all a,b in L, is known as a (left or right) Bruck loop or K-loop (named for the American mathematician Richard Bruck). The example in the following section is a Bruck loop.

Bruck loops have applications in special relativity; see Ungar (2002). Left Bruck loops are equivalent to Ungar's (2002) gyrocommutative gyrogroups, even though the two structures are defined differently.

Example
Let L denote the set of n x n positive definite, Hermitian matrices over the complex numbers. It is generally not true that the matrix product AB of matrices A, B in L is Hermitian, let alone positive definite. However, there exists a unique P in L and a unique unitary matrix U such that AB = PU; this is the polar decomposition of AB. Define a binary operation * on L by A * B = P. Then (L, *) is a left Bruck loop. An explicit formula for * is given by A * B = (A B2 A)1/2, where the superscript 1/2 indicates the unique positive definite Hermitian square root.

Bol algebra
A (left) Bol algebra is a vector space equipped with a binary operation  and a ternary operation  that satisfies the following identities: 

and

and

and
.
Note that {.,.,.} acts as a Lie triple system.

References

 
   Chapter VI is about Bol loops.
 
 

Non-associative algebra
Group theory